Lobeč is a municipality and village in Mělník District in the Central Bohemian Region of the Czech Republic. It has about 200 inhabitants.

Sights
There is a museum dedicated to life and work of Eduard Štorch.

Notable people
Václav Emanuel Horák (1800–1871), composer and liturgical musician
Eduard Štorch (1878–1956), archaeologist and writer; worked here and is buried here

References

Villages in Mělník District